Kessel is a former municipality and a city in the southeastern province of Limburg, the Netherlands. It is a small historic municipality with about 4,246 residents. It merged with neighbouring municipalities in the new municipality of Peel en Maas (as of 1 January 2010). To the west are the Heldense Bossen (Helden Forest) and to the east is the Meuse river.

It has a small historic city center with a castle and a historic market place. To the south is the Kessel-Eik neighbourhood with the Eikelenpeel and Musschenberg.

History
The d'Ewes baronets of Stowlangtoft, England are descended from Gerard D'Ewes, Lord of Kessel, at that time part of Duchy of Gelderland.

Gallery

References

External links
 
 

Municipalities of the Netherlands disestablished in 2010
Cities in the Netherlands
Populated places in Limburg (Netherlands)
Former municipalities of Limburg (Netherlands)
Peel en Maas